The Ancestor (Italian: L'antenato) is a 1936 Italian comedy film directed by Guido Brignone and starring Antonio Gandusio, Paola Barbara and Mercedes Brignone. It is an adaptation of a play by Carlo Veneziani, and was made at the Palatino Studios in Rome.

Cast
 Antonio Gandusio as barone di Montespanto
Paola Barbara as Germana
Mercedes Brignone as signora Leuci
Aldo Silvani as Ascanio
Olivia Fried as Vannetta
Minna Rubino Rossini as Fanny
Maurizio D'Ancora as Guiscardo di Montespanto
Guglielmo Barnabò as Bergandi
Claudio Ermelli as Samuele
Vittorio Simbolotti as Egido
Dina Romano
Alessandra Varna
Rocco D'Assunta
Giovanni Conforti

References

Bibliography 
 Moliterno, Gino. Historical Dictionary of Italian Cinema. Scarecrow Press, 2008.

External links 

1936 films
Italian comedy films
1936 comedy films
1930s Italian-language films
Films directed by Guido Brignone
Italian films based on plays
Italian black-and-white films
Films scored by Renzo Rossellini
Films shot at Palatino Studios
1930s Italian films